Metamorphosis is the fifth album by pianist Don Friedman which was recorded in 1966 and released on the Prestige label.

Reception

The AllMusic review by Michael G. Nastos stated: "For Friedman's fifth recording, he is definitely exploring the progressive edges of modern mainstream post-bop... Certainly Friedman challenges listeners with this music, but he also challenges his own abilities and concepts. For the time period, it is one of the most vital, original, progressive statements, and one that, after all these years, retains a timeless freshness that bears not only a second listening, but consideration as a creative music hallmark.".

Track listing 
All compositions by Don Friedman, except as indicated
 "Wakin' Up" – 4:53  
 "Spring Sign" – 11:38  
 "Drive" (Jimmy Giuffre) – 4:47  
 "Extension" (Attila Zoller) – 9:17  
 "Troubadours Groovedour" (Zoller) – 6:44  
 "Dream Bells" (Zoller) – 7:30

Personnel 
Don Friedman – piano
Attila Zoller – guitar
Richard Davis – bass
Joe Chambers – drums

References 

1966 albums
Don Friedman albums
Prestige Records albums
Albums recorded at Van Gelder Studio
Albums produced by Cal Lampley